Kari Tapio Leppänen (born September 1, 1945) is a Finnish comic strip artist who has worked on the Phantom comic since 1979. Leppänen's career started in the magazine Sarjis. This was a magazine with only Finnish series. He wrote science fiction under the pseudonym Oskari. The Swedish comic strip publisher Semic became aware of his work and offered him a job as a painter on the Phantom series. He accepted the offer. Leppänen is still painting for the Phantom.

External links 
 Kari Leppänen biography, Phantomwiki
 Kari Leppänen biografi Fantomet.org (in Norwegian)

1945 births
Living people
The Phantom
Finnish comics artists